Toon Greebe (born 25 September 1988 in Den Bosch) is a Dutch darts player.

Career

Greebe reached the quarter finals of the 2007 Dutch Open. He beat Spain's Carlos Rodriguez in the last 32 stage and then defeated Stephen Bunting in the last 16, eventually losing to fellow Dutchman Edwin Max. Greebe then began playing in PDC tournaments, reaching the third round of the 2007 US Open, losing 3-1 in sets to Phil Taylor. He then suffered a first round exit in the 2007 UK Open, losing to Steve Cusick.

Greebe qualified for the 2008 PDC World Darts Championship, losing in the first round 3-2 in sets to Peter Manley. Afterwards, Greebe began playing for the BDO/WDF again, reaching the quarter finals in the 2008 Isle of Man Open. But in August 2008, he once more played in the PDC Pro Tour, reaching the second round of the PDC German Players Championship, beating Erwin Extercatte before losing to Mark Dudbridge.

Greebe joined the PDC Pro Tour full-time shortly afterwards and he slowly climbed up the order of merit since with numerous last 16 placings as well as a quarter-final place in the PDPA Players Championship in Nuland and Wales.  Greebe also dropped five stone in weight which received much praise from fellow players and commentators, in particular Rod Harrington who has stated for years that darts players need to keep fit and in shape to compete.

Greebe qualified for the 2010 PDC World Darts Championship through the European Order of Merit but lost in the first round to John Part.

Greebe then left the PDPA due to sponsorship issues and rejoined the BDO circuit.  In his first tournament since returning to the BDO, Greebe reached the final of the Welsh Open having beaten Scott Waites, Scott Mitchell, Joey ten Berge, Phill Nixon and Mark Barilli before losing to Paul Jennings.  He then reached the quarter finals of the Swiss Open and the semi-finals of the England Open.

Greebe reached the final of the 2017 German Open, losing to world number one Mark McGeeney. In December of that year, Greebe was admitted to hospital with a severe infection and had to have one of his feet amputated.

In May 2019, Greebe won the Poland Open beating Sebastian Steyer 6-3 to claim the trophy in Police.

World Championship Results

PDC

2008: 1st Round (lost to Peter Manley 2-3)
2010: 1st Round (lost to John Part 0-3)

References

External links
Profile and stats on Darts Database

1988 births
Living people
Dutch darts players
Sportspeople from 's-Hertogenbosch
Professional Darts Corporation former pro tour players